The Mall Fund owns and operates shopping centres in England using the trading name "The Mall Company". The shopping centres are usually branded and marketed as "the mall".

The Mall Fund owned up to 10% of the covered retail space in the United Kingdom, making it the largest portfolio of branded shopping centres in the United Kingdom, before some of its sites were sold off. The Fund is managed by a team of 62 from Capital & Regional's Mall Corporation.

The Fund was formed in March 2002, by Capital & Regional and Aviva Investors. New investors have come in as the portfolio has expanded, and a secondary market for the units has developed. The fund now has 45 investors, including three overseas institutions.

Locations

Current locations 
Centres owned by the company include:
 The Mall Blackburn, Blackburn
 The Mall Luton, Luton
 The Mall Maidstone, Maidstone
 The Mall Walthamstow, Walthamstow
 The Mall Wood Green, Wood Green

Former locations
The Mall Fund has disposed of some of its centres, usually by selling the premises on to another operator or holding company. In many cases, the centre will cease to use "The Mall" name and brand, and will often switch back to its previous (pre Mall) identity. The Mall Fund's most recent disposal was its shopping centre in Camberley, which was sold in 2016 and was renamed The Square in September 2017.
Centres which have been owned by The Mall Fund but are no longer in its portfolio include:
 Trinity Centre, Aberdeen
 Alhambra Shopping Centre, Barnsley
 Broadway Shopping Centre, Bexleyheath
 Pallasades Shopping Centre, Birmingham
 The Galleries, Bristol
 The Square, Camberley
 Grosvenor Shopping Centre, Chester
 Broadwalk Centre, Edgware
 The Ashley Centre, Epsom
 Howgate Shopping Centre, Falkirk
 Eastgate Shopping Centre, Gloucester
 The Exchange, Ilford
 Cleveland Centre, Middlesbrough
 Castle Mall, Norwich
 St George's Shopping Centre, Preston
 Mercury Shopping Centre, Romford
 Marlands Shopping Centre, Southampton
 The Mall Sutton Coldfield, Sutton Coldfield
 The Pavilions, Uxbridge

References

External links
 

Shopping center management firms
Mall Company